Together in the Dark (Italian: Al buio insieme) is a 1933 Italian comedy film directed by Gennaro Righelli and starring Sandra Ravel, Maurizio D'Ancora and Lamberto Picasso.

The film's sets were designed by the art director Gastone Medin.

Cast
 Sandra Ravel as Clara 
 Maurizio D'Ancora as Carlo 
 Lamberto Picasso as Impresario 
 Olga Vittoria Gentilli as Zia 
 Romolo Costa as segretario di Taiti
 Giuseppe Pierozzi as Il barista
 Carlo Ranieri as il cliente di un hotel
 Amedeo Giovacchini

References

Bibliography 
 Mancini, Elaine. Struggles of the Italian Film Industry During Fascism, 1930-1935. UMI Research Press, 1985.

External links 

1933 films
Italian comedy films
1933 comedy films
1930s Italian-language films
Films directed by Gennaro Righelli
Italian black-and-white films
1930s Italian films